Tom Sawyer and Huckleberry Finn can refer to:

Tom Sawyer & Huckleberry Finn, 2014 film
Tom Sawyer and Huckleberry Finn (1968 TV series)

See also 
Huckleberry Finn
Tom Sawyer
The Adventures of Tom Sawyer
Adventures of Huckleberry Finn